Teodor Anioła (4 November 1925 in Poznań – 10 July 1993 in Poznań) was a Polish and Lech Poznań footballer who, during the seasons when he hit his top form (1949–51), earned the nickname "Diabeł" ("Devil") for his performances as a midfielder and right-winger, which in total brought him 141 goals in 196 Polish First league games.

He has been voted Poznań's most popular sportsman in history, also in the 1985 survey in Poznań's local newspaper was voted the greatest athlete of the last 40 years. He scored three goals in seven international appearances for the Polish team.

Teodor Anioła was the brother of fellow Polish league player Jan Anioła.

References
 lechpoznan

External links

1925 births
1993 deaths
Footballers from Poznań
Polish footballers
Poland international footballers
Lech Poznań players
Ekstraklasa players
Association football midfielders